That's So Raven is an American television teen sitcom that was created by Michael Poryes and Susan Sherman, and aired on Disney Channel for four seasons between January 2003 and November 2007. The series centers on Raven Baxter (Raven-Symoné), a teenager with hidden psychic abilities. Episodes show Raven experiencing visions of future events; she must also deal with the social and personal issues of her youth. Raven often misinterprets the events she foresees, and intervenes to prevent a vision from coming true or to protect her friends and families. She uses her skills in fashion design to create elaborate disguises she wears during these schemes. Raven's secret is shared with her best friends Eddie Thomas (Orlando Brown) and Chelsea Daniels (Anneliese van der Pol), along with her brother Cory (Kyle Massey) and parents Tanya (T'Keyah Crystal Keymáh) and Victor (Rondell Sheridan). The series explores supernatural elements, family, friendship, and adolescence.

The Walt Disney Company created the series as its television network's first multi-camera sitcom  after the success of its earlier single-camera comedy series such as Even Stevens and Lizzie McGuire, the former of which executive producers David Brookwell and Sean McNamara concurrently worked on. Their joint company Brookwell McNamara Entertainment produced That's So Raven, which premiered on January 17, 2003. The series concluded on November 10, 2007, after becoming the first program on the network to reach 100 episodes, and ended because the actors were aging beyond the show's target teenage demographic. All four seasons of the show have been distributed through digital download and on the streaming service Disney+.

That's So Raven enjoyed high viewership on broadcast television in the United States, and gave rise to the development of merchandise, soundtrack albums, and video game adaptations. Television critics praised Raven-Symoné for her physical comedy in what is considered her breakthrough role. The series received two Primetime Emmy Award nominations for Outstanding Children's Program in 2005 and 2007. A spin-off entitled Cory in the House, which stars Massey and Sheridan, aired on Disney Channel for two seasons from 2007 to 2008. Raven-Symoné, van der Pol, Sheridan and Keymáh reprised their roles for the spin-off Raven's Home, which premiered in 2017.

Premise

Raven Baxter is a high-school student who has a secret psychic ability that allows her to experience short visions of future events. Often, she finds herself miscalculating the events she sees, resulting in trouble for herself, her friends and family. Raven keeps her supernatural ability a secret; only her close friends and family are aware of it. Raven attends school alongside her best friends Chelsea, who is described as "ditzy",and is an environmentalist and an artist; and Eddie, who is an aspiring rapper, is athletic and plays on the school basketball team. Raven lives with her younger brother Cory, an aspiring businessperson, and her parents Victor and Tanya. Victor initially works in a restaurant as a chef, and in the second season he opens his own restaurant called "The Chill Grill". Tanya halted her studies to raise her family but decided to continue studying law once her children were older; after the third season, she leaves the family to study in England. Raven is an aspiring fashion designer who frequently creates costumes to disguise her identity; she often implements schemes to rectify a situation or her own mistakes. In the fourth season, the show's format is slightly revised; Raven works as an intern for the famous fashion designer Donna Cabonna.

The series explores the fantasy of wanting a supernatural power children may experience. It shares similarities with series such as Sabrina the Teenage Witch and other fantasy television programs in which adolescents experience and learn to deal with miraculous abilities. Disney Channel president Rich Ross stated Raven's powers are not "dark" but rather a metaphorical representation of the unpredictability of future events. The series does not explore the origin or discovery of Raven's powers; however, her grandmother Vivian also has psychic powers. Raven often intervenes in situations to prevent a vision from coming true but she does not regularly try to control her ability or take advantage of it. Her visions often represent a self-fulfilling prophecy. Many of the program's stories take place in the high-school setting.

Production

Development

In the early 2000s, The Walt Disney Company's pay television network Disney Channel experienced success with single-camera comedy series Even Stevens and Lizzie McGuire, and others that were also aimed at a pre-adolescent audience. That's So Raven was intended to appeal to a family audience while having a female character in the comedy lead role. Michael Poryes and Susan Sherman created the series. Sherman first conceived the idea of a buddy comedy for a pre-adolescent audience, and she and Poryes decided to base it around the idea of being able to see the future, which they thought would interest young viewers. The creators pitched the concept to network executives under the working title The Future is On Me and later as Absolutely Psychic. Poryes said at her audition, Raven-Symoné read for the role of the lead character and for the comedic best-friend character Chelsea, and that she wanted to play Chelsea. Subsequently, a pilot episode in which she starred as the best friend rather than in the central role was filmed but after the test audience responded well to her and producers were impressed, the program was re-written with Raven-Symoné in the main role. Test audiences also responded favorably to the show's supernatural premise and its comedy. The series was also retitled That's So Raven. Poryes also served as an executive producer alongside David Brookwell and Sean McNamara, who concurrently produced Even Stevens for Disney Channel. Their joint company, Brookwell McNamara Entertainment produced the program in association with the network. That's So Raven became Disney Channel's first multi-camera sitcom. The series is centered on an African American family in a deliberate attempt to represent the diversity of the network's audience.

That's So Raven and Raven-Symoné's involvement as the titular character Raven were announced in a press release in November 2001. Twenty-one episodes were ordered for the first season, which began filming in Los Angeles, California, in the same month. The series was initially expected to premiere in early 2002 but the whole first season was filmed before it aired on television. The premiere broadcast of That's So Raven, which included the first four episodes of the series, occurred on Friday, January 17, 2003.

Casting

The program and its primary cast were announced in November 2001; Raven-Symoné was revealed to be portraying the titular character Raven; she had previously worked as a child actor on the NBC sitcom The Cosby Show. Raven-Symoné was reported to be Disney's first African American female star, and the first African American woman to have her name in the title of a comedy series. Joshua Alston of The A.V. Club called her role on the show her "most successful phase" and praised her physical comedy. Marsh cited her humor and commitment to comedy as a reason for her success. She is credited as "Raven" throughout the series.

The supporting cast was also first announced in November 2001. Orlando Brown portrays Raven's close friend Eddie and Anneliese van der Pol plays Chelsea, another of Raven's friends. Tricia Dixon was originally listed in the casting announcement before van der Pol joined the cast. Kyle Massey portrays Raven's younger brother, Cory. Rondell Sheridan portrays Raven's father, Victor.

T'Keyah Crystal Keymáh plays Raven's mother Tanya for the first three seasons; she left the show because she had initially expected to only work on three seasons and because she was required to provide full-time care for her ailing grandmother. Within the show's storyline, it is explained Tanya has traveled to England to pursue higher education.

Guest stars in the series include Jenifer Lewis as Raven's grandmother Vivian and Anne-Marie Johnson as famous fashion designer Donna Cabonna in the show's fourth season.

Writing
Poryes believed it was important to write the scripts with honesty rather than talking down to the young audience. The writers endeavored to present meaningful stories to children, including lessons about friendship, but tried not make the messages too "preachy". The series was written to reflect life as a typical teenager while also incorporating comedy, particularly through its central focus on physical humor. Van der Pol said the actors typically were not permitted to deviate from their scripted lines; however, Ross stated Raven-Symoné would improvise "comic bits". Alston described the show's nature as "goofy" with a "kid-friendly" comedy style, but also noted its complex stories revolving around "ethical challenges". The episodes did not typically air in the order of their production due to the lack of serialization in their stories.

Filming and conclusion
That's So Raven was recorded in front of a live studio audience in a set on a sound stage in Los Angeles. Filming of the first season began in November 2001. The series was filmed on two days each week and the child actors attended school on set. Prior to filming, the weekly schedule would also consist of script read-throughs, rewrites and rehearsals. A stunt coordinator was present for Raven-Symoné's slapstick and physical stunts.

The series was renewed for a second season in April 2003. Prior to the renewal, a musical episode of Even Stevens was aired in 2002; its success among the show's audience led network executives to ask Brookwell and McNamara to also produce a musical episode of That's So Raven. The musical episode of That's So Raven, entitled "The Road to Audition", was aired as part of the second season in July 2004. The success of the musical format on both Even Stevens and That's So Raven gave executives confidence in the appeal and interest of the musical genre, and inspired the development of the television film High School Musical.

While it was originally planned for a maximum of three seasons, in June 2005, That's So Raven was renewed for a fourth season, which would consist of 22 episodes and bring the program's total number of episodes to 100. The announcement marked the first time an original Disney Channel series would exceed three seasons and the first to reach 100 episodes for syndication. A film adaptation was also ordered to debut in 2007. Ross called That's So Raven the network's "most successful series". Production on the season was expected to begin in July and the episodes would be aired over the following two years. Raven-Symoné became a producer on the show's fourth season at the age of 19;her roles included having input toward casting, scripts and special effects; however, she rejected the offer to direct an episode. Brookwell and McNamara departed the series at the end of the third season when their company was replaced with Warren & Rinsler Productions. An episode of the series was aired as part of the network crossover special That's So Suite Life of Hannah Montana, which was aired in July 2006 as a crossover of The Suite Life of Zack & Cody and Hannah Montana.

Production of the series finished in January 2006, and by August, president of Disney Channels Worldwide Gary Marsh stated it was unlikely any further episodes would be produced. Due to the heavy focus on high-school stories in the series, the network decided to end the show once the characters were beginning to age beyond their teenage years.

Episodes

Reception
That's So Raven was reported to be the highest-rating original program in Disney Channel's history, a record previously held by Lizzie McGuire. The program's success led to two Primetime Emmy Awards nominations for Outstanding Children's Program, in 2005 and 2007. Alston said the success of That's So Raven led to Disney Channel changing its approach to original programming. He praised the chemistry between Raven-Symoné, Brown and van der Pol, which he attributed to their real-life friendships. Alston cited the episodes "A Goat's Tale" and "Out of Control" as the ones that best represent this dynamic. Raven-Symoné was widely recognized for her charisma and physical comedy in the series; Massey's "knack" for physical comedy was also praised.

Jack Seiley from DVDizzy.com said the series adheres to the format of the network's earlier sitcoms such as Lizzie McGuire but does so with lower quality; he called it their worst show. Aaron Wallace also called the show "weaker" than Lizzie McGuire in a similar DVD review. Seiley criticized the show's concept and the cast's "over-acting". According to Wallace, the structure of the episodes is repetitive and rigid.

Awards and nominations

Other media

Merchandising
That's So Raven became a successful merchandising franchise during its run; the show's merchandise includes a series of novels, dolls, board games, lunch boxes, jewelry, a fragrance and a clothing range. A line of video games was also developed; two games were released on the Game Boy Advance and That's So Raven: Psychic on the Scene was released on the Nintendo DS on November 2, 2006. Soundtrack albums That's So Raven (2004) and That's So Raven Too! (2006) feature recordings by some of the cast and guest performers. By 2006, merchandise based on the series had grossed over $400 million.

Spin-offs and adaptations

In 2005, Disney ordered a film adaptation of That's So Raven alongside the program's fourth-season renewal, which was planned for a 2007 release. Van der Pol said in 2010 a script for the film had been written but that Raven-Symoné was too busy to be involved at the time of development. The plot would have depicted Raven starting a fashion line with Eddie and Chelsea in France. The film did not enter production.

The network ordered a spin-off series entitled Cory in the House starring Massey and Sheridan in May 2006; this was the first time Disney Channel had developed a spin-off of an original series. The series depicts Cory and Victor moving to Washington, D.C., to live in the White House, where Victor begins work as the personal chef of a fictional President of the United States. The series aired for two seasons from 2007 to 2008. Another spin-off, which is entitled Raven's Home, was first reported in October 2016; Raven-Symoné and van der Pol were both revealed to be reprising their roles as Raven and Chelsea, respectively. The series follows Raven as a divorced mother of children Booker, who has inherited Raven's psychic abilities, and Nia. Chelsea, also a divorced mother, moves in with Raven to raise her son Levi. Raven-Symoné is an executive producer on the series, which premiered on July 21, 2017. Sheridan is featured as a guest and returns as a regular character for the program's fifth season; Keymáh also guest-stars in the fifth-season finale. , the show has been renewed for a sixth season. An Indian adaptation of the series entitled Palak Pe Jhalak premiered on Disney Channel in India in September 2015, and incorporates Indian culture and languages.

References
Notes

Citations

Bibliography

External links

 

 
2000s American black sitcoms
2000s American high school television series
2000s American supernatural television series
2000s American teen sitcoms
2003 American television series debuts
2007 American television series endings
ABC Kids (TV programming block)
American fantasy television series
Disney Channel original programming
English-language television shows
Fantasy comedy television series
Television shows about psychic powers
Television series about families
Television series about teenagers
Television series by Disney
Television series by Brookwell McNamara Entertainment
Television shows filmed in Los Angeles
Television shows set in San Francisco